WJEH (990 AM) was a radio station licensed to Gallipolis, Ohio. Last Owned by Thomas Susman, through licensee Vandalia Media Partners 2, LLC, it broadcast a Christian music format dedicated to the Southern gospel.

History
The station was originally licensed on July 3, 1950 with the call sign WJEH. The station changed its call sign to WGTR on June 4, 1990, and back to WJEH on June 30, 1990.

Its license was cancelled by the Federal Communications Commission on May 20, 2021.

References

External links
FCC Station Search Details: DWJEH (Facility ID: 70692)
FCC History Cards for WJEH (covering 1949-1981)

JEH (AM)
Radio stations established in 1950
1950 establishments in Ohio
Radio stations disestablished in 2021
2021 disestablishments in Ohio
Defunct radio stations in the United States
Defunct religious radio stations in the United States
JEH